Édouard Burroughs Garneau (18 January 1859 – 18 August 1911) was a Canadian politician.

Born in Quebec City, Canada East, the son of Pierre Garneau, Garneau was appointed to the Legislative Council of Quebec for de La Durantaye in 1904. A Liberal, he served until his death in 1911. Hi was the brother of Sir Georges Garneau, mayor of Quebec city.

References

External links
 

1859 births
1911 deaths
Quebec Liberal Party MLCs
Politicians from Quebec City